The M69 is a  dual three lane dual carriageway motorway in Leicestershire and Warwickshire, England. It runs between junction 21 of the M1 near Leicester and junction 2 of the M6 near Coventry. It opened in 1977.

History
The motorway, also known at the time as the 'Coventry – Leicester Motorway' was completed in 1977 following a public inquiry in 1972. It took traffic from the A46, which was subsequently downgraded.

Route
Starting at the northeastern suburbs of Coventry at junction 2 of the M6, the motorway crosses the Coventry Canal and then continues northeast past Bulkington and west of Wolvey before turning more easterly to run south of Hinckley (junction 2, known locally as 'Reacharound Island' because of the limited slip roads). It then crosses the Birmingham to Peterborough railway line terminating in the vicinity of suburban Enderby and Braunstone to the south-west of Leicester junction 3, where it meets the M1 with continuation along the A5460/A563 towards Leicester.

The M69 has no motorway service area given that this function is fulfilled at present by Leicester Forest East services and Corley services in close proximity to the start and end points of this relatively short motorway.

Proposed developments

There is an aspiration to construct a new slip road and road bridge for traffic travelling southbound on the M1 to join the M69.

Junctions
{| class="plainrowheaders wikitable"
|-
!scope=col|County
!scope=col|Location
!scope=col|mi
!scope=col|km
!scope=col|Junction
!scope=col|Destinations
!scope=col|Notes
|-
| rowspan="2" |Warwickshire
|Coventry
|0
|0
| bgcolor="#ddffdd" |M6 J2
| bgcolor="#ddffdd" | – Birmingham, Manchester – Coventry – Coventry
| bgcolor="#ddffdd" |road continues south as A46
|-
| rowspan="2" |—
|6.2
|10.0
|1
| – Tamworth, RugbyB4109 – Hinckley
|
|-
| rowspan="2" |Leicestershire
|8.9
|14.3
| bgcolor="ffdddd" |2
| bgcolor="ffdddd" |B4669 – Hinckley, Sapcote
| bgcolor="ffdddd" |No Northbound entrance or Southbound exit
|-
|Leicester
|15.7
|25.3
|M1 J21
| – Nottingham, Northampton, London – Leicester
|

Coordinate list

See also
List of motorways in the United Kingdom

References

External links

 The Motorway Archive – M69

Motorways in England
Transport in Leicestershire
Roads in Warwickshire